Izhma (Iźva) is a rural locality (a selo) and the administrative center of Izhemsky District of the Komi Republic, Russia.

Population: 

It lies on the Izhma River. Its airport was closed in 2003 but still functions as a helipad.

References

Notes

Sources

Rural localities in the Komi Republic